Ralph Edward Sharman (April 11, 1895 – May 24, 1918), nicknamed "Bally", was a professional baseball player who played as an outfielder in Major League Baseball for the 1917 Philadelphia Athletics.

Career
Born in Cleveland, Ohio, Sharman was a right-handed batter who began his professional baseball career in 1915, at the age of 20, for the Portsmouth Cobblers of the Class-D Ohio State League. He had five home runs in 103 games played, and had a .397 batting average in 393 at bats. In 1916, he moved up and began the season with the class-B Galveston Pirates of the Texas League (TL). After playing in 120 games for the Pirates, he promoted to the class-A Memphis Chickasaws of the Southern Association. He did not hit well for the Chickasaws in 1916, just a .132 batting average in 15 games, and he returned to the TL in 1917. He began the season with the Fort Worth Panthers, then later re-joined the Pirates. In total, he collected 203 hits, three home runs, and had a .341 batting average during the TL season.

He signed with the Philadelphia Athletics toward the end of the Major League Baseball season in 1917. He made his debut with the team on September 10, playing in both games of a doubleheader against the New York Yankees. He played 13 games for the Philadelphia Athletics, batting .297 and collecting 11 hits, 2 doubles, a triple, 2 RBIs, a stolen base, and three walks.

Military and death
It was reported on November 3, 1917 that Sharman had enlisted into the United States Army in Cincinnati. With the United States engaged in World War I, he began his artillery training on November 5, the following Monday. He drowned while swimming in the Alabama River during training at Camp Sheridan, Alabama on May 24, 1918.  He is interred at Spring Grove Cemetery in Cincinnati.

Sharman was one of eight Major League Baseball players known either to have been killed or died from illness while serving in the armed forces during World War I.  The others were Alex Burr‚ Harry Chapman, Larry Chappell‚ Harry Glenn, Eddie Grant‚ Newt Halliday and Bun Troy.

See also
 List of baseball players who died during their careers

References

Bibliography

External links

1895 births
1918 deaths
Philadelphia Athletics players
Major League Baseball outfielders
Baseball players from Cleveland
United States Army personnel of World War I
Deaths by drowning in the United States
Accidental deaths in Alabama
Portsmouth Cobblers players
Galveston Pirates players
Memphis Chickasaws players
Fort Worth Panthers players
Burials at Spring Grove Cemetery
American military personnel killed in World War I